Philipp Schwartz (born 19 July 1894 in Versec, Banat, Hungary, died 1 December 1977 in Fort Lauderdale, United States) was a Hungarian-born neuropathologist. In the interwar period he was a professor in Frankfurt, Germany.

Early career
He studied medicine in Budapest and earned his doctorate there in 1919. In the same year, he became an assistant of Bernhard Fischer at the Senckenberg Institute of Pathology at the University of Frankfurt, where he worked for the next 14 years. He earned his Habilitation in 1923, became an associate professor in 1926 and a full professor in 1927.

Life in exile
He notably established contacts with Turkish universities. Together with Albert Malche, Schwartz convinced the Turkish government to offer a significant number of persecuted German professors employment in Turkey. Finally, contracts of up to five years were signed. Over time around 150 academics immigrated to Turkey. Most of them were from the economic, finance, legal or medical fields, while social sciences played a less important role. He later became director of the Department of Pathology at the University of Istanbul.

From 1953 he worked as a pathologist at the Warren State Hospital in Pennsylvania and chaired a research department there. In 1957 he was formally reinstated as a Professor (emeritus) at the Goethe University, but the university declined his wish to resume teaching due to his age.

Family
His daughter is the Zurich psychiatrist Susan Ferenz-Schwartz. He is interred at the Fluntern Cemetery in Zurich.

References 

Hungarian pathologists
German pathologists
American pathologists
Academic staff of Goethe University Frankfurt
Scientists from Frankfurt
1894 births
1977 deaths
Hungarian emigrants to Germany
German emigrants to the United States